Zirkus Zeitgeist is the tenth studio album by German medieval metal group Saltatio Mortis.

Track listing

Charts

Weekly charts

Year-end charts

References 

2015 albums
Saltatio Mortis albums